Chillout 2003/The Ultimate Chillout is a compilation album released by Nettwerk. It is the third from The Ultimate Chillout franchise.

Track listing 
Adapted from AllMusic and the album's official liner notes.

References

External links 
 

2003 compilation albums
Nettwerk Records compilation albums